Amy Zerner and Monte Farber are a duo of writers and illustrators active in the fields of astrology and spirituality. As a married couple, they have written over 50 books and achieved sales of over 3 million copies. Cited as among the world's foremost designers of astrological publications, oracle and divination systems, and related products, Farber serves as the primary author while Zerner both writes and illustrates. The couple published their first book in 1988, and have subsequently released their work throughout the world with publications in 18 languages.

Early lives
Amy Zerner was born in Teaneck, New Jersey in 1951 into a family of artists. Her maternal grandfather Clayton Spicer was a landscape painter, while her mother Jessie Spicer Zerner was an illustrator of children's books. From an early age, Zerner was involved in making her own art, including collages created from natural materials found in the woods near her childhood home. In 1967, Zerner's family moved to East Hampton, New York. By 1969, she had already begun to design and sew her own clothes, and was inspired by the local countercultural art scene. After graduating from East Hampton High School in 1969, she enrolled in the Pratt Institute in Brooklyn to study art. By 1974, she had begun studying at the School of Visual Arts and had moved into designing theatrical props under the guidance of Tony Walton, including the premiere Broadway run of Chicago. She has also designed clothing and jewelry for Bergdorf Goodman and celebrity clients.

Monte Farber was born in Brooklyn, New York in 1950. His father was a sergeant in the New York City Police Department stationed in the then-existent 74th Precinct covering Prospect Park, and Farber's early life was spent around the police station. During his teenage years, relations with his father deteriorated and he was thrown out of the house at age 17. Farber, a budding musician, lived on the streets for some time. By 1969, he had joined a progressive rock band called The Flow which played free concerts to protest the Vietnam War at the Central Park Bandstand, Baruch College, and a 1972 campaign rally for George McGovern.

Farber and Zerner met in October 1974 during the making of Up the Girls, a pornographic film intended as the first 'feminist adult production'; Farber was playing in a percussion band in a crowd scene, while Zerner was an invited guest. The two began dating and got married in 1978. The same year, Farber's burgeoning music career was featured in The New York Times in an article focusing on his performances with Roland the Robot, a musical automaton of his own creation. By this point, both Farber and Zerner had become interested in astrology, with Farber providing sun sign astrology columns for the Hamptons-based lifestyle publication Dan's Papers, and Zerner featuring astrological imagery and symbolism in her tapestry art. Farber continued to pursue a musical career, but struggled to enter the mainstream industry. He then turned to film and television, working in the mid-1980s for WNET and as a location manager and personal bodyguard on the films A Chorus Line (1985), The Last Dragon (1985), The Money Pit (1986), and The Secret of My Success (1987). Facing both professional and personal difficulties, the couple decided to refocus their lives on the shared passions of astrology, tarot, and creativity.

Careers

Publishing
In the mid-1980s, Farber and Zerner decided to combine their interests in astrology, writing, and art into a publication. Farber's first book and card set, Karma Cards, was published in 1988 by Penguin Books and went on to sell over 300,000 copies worldwide. Buoyed by this success, the couple collaborated on the next book, The Enchanted Tarot, published by St. Martin's Press in 1992; Farber provided the text, while Zerner spent 2 years creating the art. The book was another major success, selling over 250,000 copies and being published throughout the world. More books followed, which included the pair's self-help relationship guide Love, Light and Laughter (2002), Farber's lifestyle guide Quantum Affirmations (2012), and the astrology-based cookbook Signs & Seasons (2017). In 2006, Farber and Zerner established a publication deal with Barnes & Noble's imprint Sterling Publishing, leading the chain to establish dedicated shelves for the pair's books in all their stores. The couple remained productive during the COVID-19 pandemic, publishing 3 books in 2020–21. The pair were the first astrologers to sell tarot card products on national television, with appearances on QVC and HSN starting in the 1990s. They also eagerly explored new technologies and mediums. Farber developed a tarot reading software application and exhibited at the Consumer Electronics Show in 1996, and later served as a psychic contributor to the financial website TheStreet from 2008 to 2010. In 2020, Zerner and Farber hosted the online weekly talk show Ask the Oracles together with family friend Jeff Pulver, and in 2021, the couple had a cryptocurrency issued in their honor by the Rally.io platform. In total, Farber and Zerner have had over 50 books published, as well as card decks, divination sets, and meditation CDs.

Art
Zerner's development as an artist continued after meeting Farber and gradually evolved into collage-based paintings on fabric; a process she mastered over a period of four years. In 1986, she received a National Endowment for the Arts fellowship for her creative work in this style; the added recognition and sales allowed her to expand the scale and complexity of her work, including a large work for public display at the City University of New York. Her first collaboration with Farber consisted of the illustrations for The Enchanted Tarot in 1992, which were subsequently showcased as full tapestries. Zerner has had solo and group exhibitions through the Women's Caucus for Art (1983); on the campuses of Eastern Kentucky University (1983), State University of New York at Stony Brook (1984), Pacific Lutheran University (1988), State University of New York at Plattsburgh (1989), and Lebanon Valley College (1996); and at the Parrish Art Museum (1984; work chosen for exhibition by Audrey Flack), the East Hampton Center for Contemporary Art (1985), the Rubin Museum of Art (2010), and the University of North Texas ArtSpace Dallas (2015–16).

Fashion
Zerner's interest in fashion design dated back to her youth; as a young adult, she continued to work with designs for accessories and props for the theatre. Following the awarding of her NEA grant, she moved into applying the same painting and construction techniques she used for her tapestries to articles of clothing. Zerner found that a particularly suitable medium for this style was the Tibetan panel coat of the style used for religious ceremonies; the central panel of the coat was ideal for decoration with silks, brocades, and other fabrics to compose metaphysical images. In 1999, after being approached by New York-based Bergdorf Goodman, Zerner was commissioned to produce 6 such pieces. This was followed by an order for 50 more by Bergdorf Goodman's parent firm, Neiman Marcus, centering on depictions of goddesses and mythological themes. Subsequently, Zerner continued to produce art coats for Bergdorf Goodman and on commission from clients, with custom couture produced for Simon Kirke, Patti LaBelle, Oprah Winfrey, Shirley MacLaine, and Elizabeth Taylor. Zerner has also produced jewelry for Bergdorf Goodman, with examples worn by Rihanna and Kylie Jenner.

Documentary film
In October 2022, independent film production company AMMO Entertainment and producer Annmarie Sairrino announced they would be producing a feature-length documentary film about Farber and Zerner, to be produced and released under the company's specialty label AMMO Select. The film will focus on the couple's creative career and be framed as a love story. Sairrino will produce and direct the film. Production on the film began in late 2022, and the film's trailer and promotional poster were unveiled in January 2023 as part of an Indiegogo crowdfunding campaign to support the production and release of the film. The film's anticipated release is scheduled for late 2024.

Personal lives
Zerner and Farber live in East Hampton, New York in Zerner's childhood home.

References

Further reading
 

1950 births
1951 births
20th-century American male writers
20th-century American non-fiction writers
20th-century American women artists
20th-century American women writers
20th-century astrologers
21st-century American male writers
21st-century American non-fiction writers
21st-century American women artists
21st-century American women writers
21st-century astrologers
American astrologers
American astrological writers
American psychics
American self-help writers
American spiritual writers
American textile designers
American women fashion designers
American fashion designers
Living people
National Endowment for the Arts Fellows
Nautilus Book Award winners
New Age writers
People from Teaneck, New Jersey
Pratt Institute alumni
Tarotologists
Visionary artists
Writers from Brooklyn
Writing duos